Bad Dürrenberg was a Verwaltungsgemeinschaft ("collective municipality") in the Saalekreis district, in Saxony-Anhalt, Germany. The seat of the Verwaltungsgemeinschaft was in Bad Dürrenberg. It was disbanded on 1 January 2010.

The Verwaltungsgemeinschaft Bad Dürrenberg consisted of the following municipalities:
 Bad Dürrenberg
 Nempitz 
 Tollwitz

References

Former Verwaltungsgemeinschaften in Saxony-Anhalt